The stuttering frog (Mixophyes balbus) is a large species of frog that inhabits temperate and sub-tropical rainforest and wet sclerophyll forest in Australia.

Distribution
This frog's historical distribution ranged from the Timbarra River near Drake in northern New South Wales, to the Cann River catchment in eastern Victoria and covered an area of approximately 110 000 km². Populations south of Sydney have declined dramatically and the Victorian populations are believed to be extinct. It has also disappeared from a number of sites in NSW where it was once common. It occurs at altitudes between 20 m and 1400 m. In the north of its range the species occurs only at high altitudes while in the south both upland and lowland populations have been recorded.

Description
This frog can reach up to 80 mm in length. Its dorsal surface is brown and diffuses laterally to merge with a pale yellow on the ventral surface. An irregular shaped blotch starts between the eyes and finishes mid-dorsal and may be broken up. There is a dark head stripe that starts before the nostril as a triangle, it then continues from the nostril to the eye, then from the eye over the tympanum and finishes over the shoulder. The tympanum is slightly oval shaped and distinct. The iris is light blue, diffusing into gold above the pupil and dark brown below. The 4-6 bars on the hind limbs are pale and indistinct. Toes are three quarters webbed and fingers are free from webbing.

Ecology and behaviour
This species is associated with flowing creeks and streams in temperate and sub-tropical rainforest, wet sclerophyll forest and Antarctic Beech forests. The call is a "kook kook kook kra-a-ak kruk kruk" - lasting one to two seconds. The male calls while next to the stream, often on leaf litter, and spawn is deposited in dug-out, gravel nests in shallow, flowing water. Tadpoles usually reach 65 mm but may be up to 80 mm in length. Tadpoles are dark brown or black with large spots and flecks on the tail. Metamorphosis may take 15 months and the metamorphs closely resemble the adults, but have less distinct dorsal pattern and a rusty red iris.

Similar species
This frog can be distinguished from all other Mixophyes species by the blue crescent in the upper iris, except for Mixophyes fleayi. It can be distinguished from Mixophyes fleayi by the lack of mottling on the flanks.

References

Anstis, M. 2002. Tadpoles of South-eastern Australia. Reed New Holland: Sydney.
Barker, J.; Grigg, G.C.; Tyler, M.J. (1995). A Field Guide to Australian Frogs. Surrey Beatty & Sons.
Department of Environment and Heritage - Stuttering Frog
Frogs Australia Network - Frog call available here

Amphibians of New South Wales
Amphibians of Victoria (Australia)
Mixophyes
Vulnerable fauna of Australia
Amphibians described in 1968
Frogs of Australia